Marmnamarz (Armenian: Մարմնամարզ), published between 1911 and 1914, was one of the first sport magazines in the Ottoman Empire. The magazine was established by Shavarsh Krissian who also edited it. The first issue appeared in February 1911. Published monthly in Armenian language (with "Marmnamarz" meaning sport in Armenian) the magazine offered an additional incentive for extending the interest towards the sport among the Ottoman Armenians. 

Marmnamarz, the "body of national physical training", became the major instrument for the development of sport and athletic life among the Armenian population. This magazine published information about various sport games and their results, as well as published photos of Armenian and foreign athletes and Armenian football teams.

Marmnamarz ceased publication in 1914.

See also
Armenian Sport in the Ottoman Empire

References

1911 establishments in the Ottoman Empire
1914 disestablishments in the Ottoman Empire
Armenian-language magazines
Defunct magazines published in Turkey
Magazines established in 1911
Magazines disestablished in 1914
Magazines published in Istanbul
Monthly magazines published in Turkey
Sports magazines